Freedom™, the sequel to Daemon, is the second of a two-part novel, by American writer Daniel Suarez, about a distributed, persistent computer application, known as The Daemon, that begins to change the real world after the original programmer's death.

Plot
The sequel picks up shortly after the end of Daemon. Sobol's distributed AI has already infiltrated the computer systems of numerous companies and governments. Many companies have surrendered, either out of fear of annihilation or because they have been converted to the fairer and more efficient system using a kind of government by algorithm. While the Daemon is a technological creation, much of the work is carried out by human beings, compelled by the Daemon to change the world, according to the vision of Matthew Sobol.

Connected by the "Darknet", the human followers, using Sobol's game engine (for his award-winning game "The Gate") as a base, have created their own ranking system and economy. Online identities mimic an MMORPG, with operatives doing tasks to gain levels and gaining access to new technologies and help from the Daemon in an effort to advance their communities. Numerous towns have slowly joined the Daemon's network as a means to improve their own situations and their society as a whole.

The rest of the world believes the Daemon is still a hoax, due to the efforts of the US government (and its allies) to appear to the general public that they are still in charge. In truth, the American political and economic system is collapsing, with the price of fuel and the unemployment rates both skyrocketing.

As with the first book, the interweaving stories follows specific characters:

Detective Sebeck, now acting as an unwilling Daemon operative, has been sent on a "quest" by the avatar of the late Matthew Sobol, one in which will to determine the role of freedom to the human race. Using special glasses to see online Darknet items and threads, Sebeck is joined by a Daemon operative, Laney Price, and he soon learns that his quest is being monitored by the entire Darknet community.

Sebeck begins his quest meeting another operative named Riley, who introduces him to the newly growing Daemon communities, dubbed Holons, which are based on being self-sufficient, using natural energy sources and technologies, and avoiding the military-industrial complex opposed to the type of freedom that the Daemon communities want. Riley teaches Sebeck how to navigate the Darknet and to use it to his advantage. With Laney in tow, Sebeck journeys around the country, always witnessing important events in the history of the Daemon. Sebeck reunites with Jon Ross in a town called Greely, Iowa.

It is one of several Midwestern towns chosen by the elite powers for invasion and destruction. Sebeck's Darknet quest thread returns, and he and Laney follow it through enemy lines, only to discover that it is a trap laid by the Major, who has developed a means of infiltrating the Daemon mainframe and make slight alterations. After being bound and interrogated by the Major, who offers to give him his former life back as a detective, husband, and father in return for his cooperation and information, Sebeck refuses. As he and Laney are taken to be executed via a wood chipper, Loki arrives with a pack of Razorbacks, killing their captors, and Moseley arrives to rescue him and Price. Reuniting with other Darknet faction members, Sebeck participates in the attack on the Sky Ranch that results in the destruction of the corporate monopoly and the Daemon research team.

After the fighting, Sebeck resumes his quest and travels with Laney, Jon Ross, and Natalie Phillips to Morgan's Point Cemetery in Texas. The 3D avatar of Mathew Sobol reveals his intentions and desires for a world in which all are equal. Having seen both sides and the war that followed Sebeck makes the choice that the Daemon is not a threat and allows the world now forming to exist. Then, Sebeck is rewarded with an online message from his son Chris, who forgives him for all that has happened, and Sebeck happily heads home to be reunited with his family.

Jon Ross, fearing both the established authority and the actions of people like Loki, has joined the Daemon community to help shape it into a thing for good. He travels to China to recruit an old friend (and former spy) Shen Liang, but Liang refuses to believe that the Daemon network is real. Using Daemon technology that cloaks his image on CCTV cameras, Ross escapes before he can be taken into custody. Ross attempts to convince Natalie Phillips to join the Daemon community, but she rebuffs him. Ross then heads to Greely, meeting Hank Fossen, awaiting Sebeck's approach. The reunion is short-lived when they learn that Greely is surrounded by private security forces.

Ross joins several other townsfolk to defend Greely, but they are outnumbered and outmatched by the heavy weapons and armored fighting vehicles of the private security forces. They are almost killed, but the virtual Darknet avatar of Roy Merritt, a Level 200 champion, rescues them and defeats the private security forces with airborne laser drones after they refuse to surrender. Worried that Natalie will be in danger from Loki's machines during his impending attack on Sky Ranch, he travels there to give her a Darknet Amulet of Protection. After the battle is won, he and Natalie join Sebeck in the last leg of his quest, preparing for a life together.

At the funeral for Roy Merritt, NSA Agent Natalie Philips is approached by Loki who informs her that the Daemon operatives attending are there to honor his memory. Merritt has become a folk hero of the Darknet, known as "The Burning Man" by the Darknet users, who respect him for his tenacity. Loki tries to show her that she is working for the wrong side, but instead, she attempts to warn the authorities. Loki, in response, attacks a number of funeral attendants but only members of the private military contractor employed by the Major, Korr Security International.

Following the funeral, Phillips is made a scapegoat and relieved of her duties at the NSA. Ross attempts to convince her to join the Daemon community, but she refuses. Phillips has a plan to stop the government from taking control of the Daemon by destroying it. To that effect, Phillips allows herself to be recruited by the Major and a man named General Johnston. Flown to the Sky Ranch, the remaining base of operations for the ani-Daemon forces, Phillips is informed of their plan to seize control of the Daemon in a worldwide operation code, named Exorcist. After reading over a detailed report of Operation Exorcist, Phillips is highly suspicious of the relatively simple exploit in the Daemon's code that is described.

With the defeat of the General's offensive against the Daemon communities, Phillips is reunited with Ross, and together, they realize that Johnston's true plan is to allow most of the world's corporations to be destroyed by the Daemon (while protecting their own assets) and using the inevitable chaos to seize control of key facilities around the globe and declare a new world order with them in control. The General has no real use for Phillips other than to testify to the world the orthodox details of how the Daemon was supposedly defeated from the bogus report that she was given after the operation itself was over. However, they soon learn that Sobol had intentionally left fake errors in the Daemon's code and that the Daemon was many steps ahead of the private corporations, broadcasting their attempt to take over the world to the public and eliminating the personal wealth of everyone in charge. Declaring her love for Ross, together, they head off with Sebeck to witness him finish his quest and prepare for their future together.

Brian Gragg ("Loki Stormbringer") is the most powerful known human Daemon operative in existence, a Level 56 Sorcerer. Working with only his personal contingent of Razorbacks along with advanced weapons and armor, he scours America looking for the Major. Though he is well known, his rankings is low for his antisocial behavior and his rude, spiteful disposition. Heinrich Boerner, the 3D avatar of the Nazi soldier Gragg defeated to gain the attention of the Daemon in the first place, offers to become his ally because of Loki's extremely high power level, offering to commit any act or execute any order upon the conditions of the said order being met, including taking revenge for Loki if he were to be killed. Loki quickly accepts this offer.

Loki's first attempt to kill the Major fails when the Major escapes across water, where he is safe from Loki's machines, but eventually, Loki gains a lead that allows him to track the Major to a roadside motel. After using his Razorbacks, AutoM8s, and 'Angel Teeth' (guided spikes dropped from above) to kill the private security team guarding the Motel, he enters to find not the Major but an attractive girl, being held hostage. She claims that she is a low-level Daemon operative captured on a mission to deliver a valuable Darknet power ring. When Loki puts the ring on in an attempt to steal it, the ring injects Loki with a paralytic serum; he kills the girl with a blast of lightning before falling to the ground. Before falling unconscious, he sees several more men enter the room and destroy his Razorbacks, which he is unable to control, and he is finally captured by the Major.

Brought to a stable, Loki is stripped nude and tortured by the Major and removed from the Daemon's network. All biometric markers are cut off including his tongue, eyes and finger tips. However, it is later revealed that he was eventually rescued by the avatar of Boerner and implanted with cybernetic eyes, fingers, and a hypersonic speech module. He rescues Sebeck from being killed and then uses his Darknet power to dispatch an enormous army AutoM8's and Razorbacks to level Sky Ranch, hellbent on killing the Major.

After defeating the perimeter guard, his brutal assault on everyone at the Sky Ranch (including civilians) incurs the ire of the entire Daemon community. After being a large amount of negative ratings, the avatar of Roy Merritt arrives and attempts to reason with him to stop the killing, but when he refuses, Merritt uses his power to demote Loki to just level 10. Emotionally ruined and with all of his power taken away, Loki collapses, but his fellow Daemon members reach out to help him.

Hank Fossen is a third-generation farmer from Greely, who is recruited into the Daemon network by his daughter Jenna. Fighting a nuisance lawsuit against a company Halperin Organix, which has been illegally planting seeds on his property to create patent violations, Hank learns of Jenna's participation with a suspicious group in town. Jenna reveals the concept of the Daemon to Hank and promises that Halperin Organix's lawsuit will be dismissed now that they have gained "level 4 legal protection."

An assault on their farm, by hired mercenaries, is thwarted by Ross and other Daemon operatives, but upon learning about the impending assault on Greely, Hank sends Jenna and his wife to a predetermined shelter and then tries to help make a stand with Ross and the local Sheriff. Hank is shot and killed in the assault, but his sacrifice is not in vain. Using a community-created 3D avatar of Roy Merritt to coordinate a counterattack, the holon of Greely is able to defeat the assault force.

The Major is now the most wanted man in the Daemon community for his numerous crimes including the murder of Roy Merritt. An old hand at suppressing third worlds, the Major continues to make plans against the Daemon. He ruminates about his past as a heavy for the big corporations, killing people who have threatened their exploitation of foreign countries. He escapes an attempt on his life by Loki, but the experience makes the Major realize that he may not win this war.

In battling the Daemon, the government has been forced into a difficult alliance with private corporations employing the Major, giving rise to private armies who use the cover of night and corporate propaganda to create a state of fear. Intensifying his efforts the Major has dispatched foreign bought mercenaries and uses the corporate media to lie to the general public.

Developing a way to penetrate the Darknet by recruiting homeless teenagers, he eventually ambushes Loki taking him prisoner. He tortures Loki both for revenge and so that the Major can steal his identity within the Darknet. He later heads the Midwestern offensive from the Sky Ranch while simultaneously capturing Sebeck. After a speech in which he notes that the general population needs to be controlled by a ruling class, he orders Sebeck to be killed to keep the cover story of his past "execution".

After his plans collapse, the Major hides in a secret bomb shelter at Sky Ranch and awaits a chance to escape. Ten days after the defeat of his forces, the Major heads above ground now using Loki's stolen identity, only to discover that he is surrounded by both Razorbacks and the 3D avatar of Boerner.

The book ends with his inevitable death and the start of a new world.

References

 Interview with Daniel Suarez, titled  "Understanding the Daemon"
 An interview with Daniel Suarez on the BookBanter podcast
 Joi Ito's Review of Daemon
 Daemons: IT Keepsakes; Jim Rapoza, eWeek
 A Book Review: Don Donzal, Editor-in-Chief, The Ethical Hacker Network

External links

 

2010 American novels
Techno-thriller novels
Novels about computing
2010 science fiction novels
American science fiction novels
Novels about the Internet
Transhumanist books
Utopian novels
Postcyberpunk novels
Mixed reality
Augmented reality in fiction
Social reputation in fiction
Social science fiction
Cybernetted society in fiction
Hive minds in fiction
Massively multiplayer online role-playing games in fiction
Novels about death
Detective novels
Propaganda in fiction
Technological utopianism
Government by algorithm in fiction
E. P. Dutton books